HMS Odzani (K356) was a  that served in the Royal Navy.

Construction and design
Odzani was one of three River-class frigates ordered by the British Admiralty on 15 July 1942. She was named after a river in Mashonaland (then part of Southern Rhodesia, now part of Zimbabwe) following the loss of the destroyer  in 1941. The ship was laid down at Smith Dock's Middlesbrough shipyard on 18 November 1942, was launched on 19 May 1943 and completed on 2 September that year.

References

 
 
 
 
 
 
 

1943 ships
River-class frigates of the Royal Navy